Royal de Luxe is a French mechanical marionette street theatre company which specialises in giant puppets. They were founded in 1979 in Aix-en-Provence by Jean-Luc Courcoult. After some years based in Toulouse, the company moved to Nantes in 1989. The company has performed in France, Belgium, England, Germany, Iceland, Chile, Australia, Mexico, Canada, Switzerland, the Netherlands and Ireland.

Giants spectacular

Technical data 
Sources: Portraits des géants on the Nantes website.

Gallery

Other works 

 The true history of France
 Roman photo tournage
 The Peplum (with odorama)
 Revolt of the Mannequins. After Nantes in February 2008 and Antwerp, in July 2008, It was played in Berlin, in November 2008
 They were also said to have made another giant, more lightweight elephant used in Take That Presents: The Circus Live, atop which the four band members performed "The Garden". This elephant had to be made much more lightweight to be transported between venues.

See also
 La Princesse, a giant mechanical spider designed by the same man who designed the Sultan's Elephant but produced by La Machine - a different performing arts company.
 Les Balayeurs du désert, an accompanying band who perform much of the music for productions run by the Royal de Luxe.
 Machines of the Isle of Nantes

References

External links 

 Royal de Luxe official site
 About Royal De Luxe (note that as of October, 2008, the site had no new updates since 2006)
 BBC, "How giants genius Jean-Luc Courcoult fell for Liverpool", 25 July 2014
 BBC article about Royal de Luxe, 24 December 2012
 La Révolte des Mannequins ("Revolt of the Mannequins") Extensive photoblog of Royal de Luxe's show in Nantes, France, February 2008
 I, for one, welcome the Giant French Rocket Girl and her Elephant of Royal Luxury! has a collection of links about the performance in Nantes
 The Sultan's Elephant in London
 Extracts from an interview with Jean Luc Courcoult by Jean-Christophe Planche
The Sultan's Elephant in Le Havre on October 2006. Pictures and videos
Photos and info, news, links etc. from Royal de Luxe events all over the world.
 Photo Album about Royal de Luxe on Fotopedia
 

Theatre companies in France
Street theatre
Culture of Pays de la Loire
Companies based in Pays de la Loire
Nantes